{{Speciesbox
|taxon =Nepotilla mimica
|image = Nepotilla mimica 001.jpg
|image_caption =  Original image of a shell of Nepotilla mimica
|authority = (Sowerby III, 1896)
| synonyms_ref = 
| synonyms =
 Daphnella (Teres) mimica Sowerby III, 1896
 Zenepos mimica (Sowerby III, 1897)
|display_parents = 3
}}Nepotilla mimica''' is a species of sea snail, a marine gastropod mollusk in the family Raphitomidae.

Variety Nepotilla mimica fusca (Sowerby III, 1896) : a dark brown variety.

Description
The length of the shell attains 7 mm, its diameter 2.5 mm.

This little, white, turreted shell bears rather a curious resemblance to the Daphnella (Teres) (synonym of Teretia teres'' (Reeve, 1844) ). The spire is elongate and very sharp. The shell contains  6 convex, rounded whorls. These are slightly concave at the top. The sculpture consists of conspicuous lirae, alternated with smaller lirae, sculptedc lengthwise by minute, oblique lamellae. The body whorl is rather short, contracted at the base and slightly rostrate. The columella is slightly twisted. The aperture is ovate. The outer lip is sharp and arcuate. The sinus is deep and not very wide. 

The author has only seen three specimens, the type here described being the largest. The two smaller ones are shorter in proportion, and not so concave at the top of the whorls.

Distribution
This marine species is endemic to Australia and occurs off Victoria, South Australia and Tasmania

References

 Verco, J.C. 1909. Notes on South Australian marine Mollusca with descriptions of new species. Part XII. Transactions of the Royal Society of South Australia 33: 293–342
 May, W.L. 1923. An illustrated index of Tasmanian shells: with 47 plates and 1052 species. Hobart : Government Printer 100 pp.
 Powell, A.W.B. 1966. The molluscan families Speightiidae and Turridae, an evaluation of the valid taxa, both Recent and fossil, with list of characteristic species. Bulletin of the Auckland Institute and Museum. Auckland, New Zealand 5: 1–184, pls 1–23

External links
  Hedley, C. 1922. A revision of the Australian Turridae. Records of the Australian Museum 13(6): 213-359, pls 42-56 
 
 Grove, S.J. (2018). A Guide to the Seashells and other Marine Molluscs of Tasmania: Nepotilla mimica

mimica
Gastropods described in 1896
Gastropods of Australia